Special attack may refer to:

A euphemism for suicide attack, used in whole or in part for the names of some World War II units:
Japanese Special Attack Units, a variety of suicide units and weapons
Kamikaze, a Japanese special attack air unit type
Surface Special Attack Force, the ten ships assigned to Operation Ten-Go
Sonderkommando Elbe, a German interceptor unit  
Special attacks, a feature of fighting video games
Special attack (Pokémon)

See also
Attack (disambiguation)